The 2022 United States Senate election in Kentucky was held on November 8, 2022 to elect a member of the United States Senate to represent Kentucky. Incumbent Republican Rand Paul won reelection to a third term, defeating Democrat Charles Booker.

Paul was first elected in 2010 with 56% of the vote, filling the seat of retiring Jim Bunning, then re-elected in 2016 with 57% of the vote. Paul ran for a third term. Booker is a former state representative and a candidate in the Democratic primary for the U.S. Senate in 2020. The election was called for Paul shortly after polls closed in the state.

Background 
Although Rand Paul supports a Constitutional amendment limiting Senators to two terms, he said, "I'm not in favor of term limits for some and not others. So I'm not in favor of people self-imposing term limits.  I’m a co-sponsor of the constitutional amendment, but I will run again in 2022." Kentucky held its primary election on May 17.

Republican primary

Candidates

Nominee 
Rand Paul, incumbent U.S. Senator

Eliminated in primary 
Arnold Blankenship, retiree
Valerie Frederick
Paul V. Hamilton, economics professor
John Schiess, perennial candidate
Tami Stanfield, former sales executive

Endorsements

Results

Democratic primary

Candidates

Nominee 
Charles Booker, former state representative (2019–2021) and candidate for U.S. Senate in 2020

Eliminated in primary 
Ruth Gao, educator and activist
Joshua Blanton Sr., army veteran
John Merrill, chemist and navy veteran

Declined 
 Rocky Adkins, senior advisor to Governor Andy Beshear, former minority leader of the Kentucky House of Representatives, and candidate for Governor in 2019
 Jim Gray, Kentucky Secretary of Transportation, former mayor of Lexington, KY, nominee for U.S. Senate in 2016 and candidate for Kentucky's 6th congressional district in 2018.

Endorsements

Results

General election

Predictions

Endorsements

Polling

Rand Paul vs. generic Democrat

Results

See also 
 2022 United States Senate elections
 2022 Kentucky elections

Notes

References

External links 
Official campaign websites
 Charles Booker (D) for Senate
 Rand Paul (R) for Senate

2022
Kentucky
United States Senate